Alena Kish (1889 or 1896–1949) was a Belarusian primitivist painter from the surroundings of Slutsk.

Life

Kish earned her living by making carpets for local buyers. She gained attention and recognition as an artist at the end of 1970s, three decades after her death. A collection of her surviving works are preserved in the museum of Zaslawye.

Kish was found drowned in the river. It may have been an accident, but she had difficulties in addition to her poor finances. The income from her designs was undermined when manufactured goods arrived in the area. Kish and her work were featured on a stamp and in an exhibition in Minsk in 2013.

References

External links
 

1889 births
1949 suicides
People from Slutsk District
People from Slutsky Uyezd
Belarusian painters
Suicides by drowning
Painters who committed suicide
Suicides in Belarus